This list of notable people associated with the American Whig–Cliosophic Society is made up of former students. Individuals are sorted by category and alphabetized within each category.

Politics and government

Academia

Literature and Journalism

See also
 American Whig–Cliosophic Society

References

External links
 Official website of Whig-Clio
 Notable Alumni page of Whig-Clio

American Whig-Cliosophic Society
American